The Mary Wilkins Freeman House is a historic house located at 207 Lake Avenue in the Borough of Metuchen in Middlesex County, New Jersey. It was the home of the author, Mary Eleanor Wilkins Freeman (1852–1930). Built , the house was added to the National Register of Historic Places on January 17, 2020, for its significance in literature from 1902 to 1907.

History and description
The house is a two and one-half story frame building with Italianate style, built . While renting the house, Mary Wilkins Freeman described it in humor as: She married Dr. Charles Manning Freeman here on January 1, 1902. The couple stayed here until 1907, when they moved into a new house nearby. While here, she wrote about 47 of her works.

See also
 National Register of Historic Places listings in Middlesex County, New Jersey

References

Metuchen, New Jersey
National Register of Historic Places in Middlesex County, New Jersey
Houses on the National Register of Historic Places in New Jersey
Houses in Middlesex County, New Jersey
1868 establishments in New Jersey
Houses completed in 1868
Italianate architecture in New Jersey
New Jersey Register of Historic Places